Shanghai University of Electric Power (SUEP) is a public university in Shanghai, People's Republic of China.

The campus is at 2103 Pingliang Road, Yangpu District, Shanghai 200090.

History

Shanghai University of Electric Power was originated from the "Shanghai Training School of Electric Power" (上海电业学校), which was founded in 1951. In January 1985, it was renamed to the current name. It is a full-time institution of higher education and co-run by the central government and the Shanghai municipality; it is managed mainly by the Shanghai municipality.

Academics

Faculty

International
SHUEP has established inter-university relationships with many universities in Britain, America, France, Canada, Japan, Korea, Russia and Australia. It has established 13 joint international schools and researches with foreign universities including Columbia University (USA), Oklahoma Christian University (USA), University of Strathclyde (UK), University of Hertfordshire (UK), Edith Cowan University (Australia), and the University of Kitakyushu (Japan).

External links
Official site of Shanghai University of Electric Power

Universities and colleges in Shanghai
Educational institutions established in 1951
1951 establishments in China